Arrangements for War is a Big Finish Productions audio drama based on the long-running British science fiction television series Doctor Who.

Synopsis
The Sixth Doctor and Evelyn become involved in a tricky political situation on the planet Világ.

Cast
The Doctor — Colin Baker
Evelyn Smythe — Maggie Stables
Plenipotentiary Suskind — Philip Bretherton
Paramount Minister — Geoffrey Leesley
Princess Krisztina — Katarina Olsson
Corporal Reid — Lewis Rae
Commander Pokol — Kraig Thornber
Governor Rossiter — Gabriel Woolf

Continuity
In Thicker Than Water, it is revealed that the Doctor eventually brings Evelyn back to Világ, where she decides to part company with him and marry Rossiter.

External links
Big Finish Productions – Arrangements for War

2004 audio plays
Sixth Doctor audio plays